Hanka is a 1955 Yugoslavian film directed by Slavko Vorkapić. It was entered into the 1956 Cannes Film Festival.

Plot
The film centers around Muslim gypsies in Bosnia. Cinematic writer Georges Sadoul described Hanka as a "story of love and revenge among gypsies" in his book Dictionary of Film Makers.

Cast
 Vera Gregović - Hanka
 Mira Stupica - Ajkuna
 Mihajlo Mrvaljević - Mušan
 Jovan Milicević - Sejdo
 Safet Pašalić - Propali Beg
 Karlo Bulić
 Dejan Dubajić - Sluga
 Jelena Keseljević - Majka
 Vaso Kosić - Ceribasa
 Predrag Laković
 Mavid Popović - Kapetan
 Aleksandar Stojković
 Dragutin Todić - Upravnik imanja

References

External links

1955 films
Yugoslav black-and-white films
Serbo-Croatian-language films
Films directed by Slavko Vorkapić
Films set in Yugoslavia
Films set in Bosnia and Herzegovina
Yugoslav drama films
1955 drama films